Pivotal Software, Inc. was an American multinational software and services company based in San Francisco that provided cloud platform hosting and consulting services. Since December 2019, Pivotal has been part of VMware.

History

Pivotal Software was formed in 2012 after spinning out of EMC Corporation and VMware (which was majority-owned by EMC). The name came from the Pivotal Labs LLC which had been acquired by EMC, and briefly used the name GoPivotal, Incorporated. On April 24, 2013, the organization announced a  investment from General Electric (for 10% equity) and Pivotal One, including Cloud Foundry for cloud computing.

Paul Maritz became Pivotal's chief executive immediately after the spin-out. Maritz had joined EMC in February 2008 when Pi Corporation, a company he co-founded, was acquired and was previously the CEO of VMware.
The Greenplum Database (acquired by EMC in 2010) formed the basis of a division selling software for the big data market.

In March 2013, a distribution of Apache Hadoop called Pivotal HD was announced, including a version of the Greenplum software for it called Hawq.

Paul Maritz became Pivotal's Chairman and Rob Mee, founder of Pivotal Labs, became chief executive officer of Pivotal Software on August 18, 2015. In May, 2016, a  round of investment was announced, including Ford investments. EMC also converted  of debt into equity at that time.

In March 2018, the company filed for an initial public offering, debuting on the NYSE on April 20, 2018. The trading price began at $15 a share, and closed with a 5% increase on its first day. The company raised $555 million in the IPO.

On August 14, 2019 VMware announced merger discussions with Pivotal, and a definitive agreement to acquire Pivotal Software was signed on August 22, 2019. The merger was completed on December 30, 2019. VMware folded Pivotal into the Tanzu application suite, with the Pivotal Labs consulting group rebranding to become VMware Tanzu Labs in January 2021.

See also

 Cloud Foundry
 Greenplum
 RabbitMQ
 Spring Framework

References

 
Companies acquired by Dell
Software companies based in the San Francisco Bay Area
Software companies established in 2013
Companies formerly listed on the New York Stock Exchange
2018 initial public offerings
Companies based in San Francisco
Companies based in Palo Alto, California
Corporate spin-offs
2019 mergers and acquisitions
VMware
Defunct software companies of the United States
2013 establishments in the United States
2013 establishments in California
Companies established in 2013